Luban may refer to:


Places
 Lubań (disambiguation), settlements in Poland
 Luban Road station, Shanghai
 Luban-Zardakh, Zanjan Province, Iran

People
 Binyomin Luban, American rabbi
 Sun Luban (fl. 229–258), Eastern Wu (China) imperial princess
 Yaakov Luban, American rabbi

Other uses
 Luban languages, spoken in Congo and Zambia
 Cyclone Luban, 2018

See also
 
 Lyuban (disambiguation)
 Lu Ban (c. 507–444 BC), Chinese engineer and philosopher